Thomas Longman may refer to:

 Thomas Longman (1699–1755), English publisher who founded the publishing house of Longman
 Thomas Norton Longman (1771–1842), his great nephew, English publisher
 Thomas Longman (1804–1879), son of Thomas Norton Longman, English publisher

See also
 Thomas Langmann (born 1971), French film producer and actor